Odbojkaški klub Ibar, commonly known as OK Ibar, is a volleyball club from Rožaje, Montenegro. The team competes in the First Montenegrin volleyball league.

History
OK Ibar was founded in Rožaje, FR Yugoslavia in 1993. Volleyball has its tradition in the city. In 1995. the women's team of OK Ibar became the national champion. In the mid-1990s, it was one of the best teams in Montenegro in younger leagues while the women's team played constantly as a first division team until the independence of Montenegro. Due to the difficult financial situation, OK Ibar resigned from the league in the 2012–13 season. In 2012, OK Ibar received a special award from the Rožaje Municipality for 20 years of existing.

Honours before the independence of Montenegro (in 2006)
All results are from the Montenegrin leagues.

Men's team
 Junior team
 2nd place: 1995/96
 4th place: 1996/97, 2000/2001
 5th place: 1997/98, 1998/99
 Cadet team
 3rd place: 1997/98
 4th place: 2000/2001
 5th place: 2002/03
 Pioneer team
 3rd place: 1999/00
 5th place: 1997/98

Women's team
 Senior team

 Junior team
 3. place: 2002/03
 5. place: 1999/00
 Cadet team
 3. place: 2000/01
 4. place: 1999/00
 Pioneer team
 2. place: 1999/00
 3. place: 1996/97, 2001/02, 2002/03
 4. place: 1998/99
 5. place: 2000/01

Sports Center

Sports Center Rožaje (Bosnian/Montenegrin: Sportski centar Rožaje) is a sport center located in Rožaje, Montenegro, where OK Ibar plays its home matches.
The center is located on Bandžovo Brdo, next to the main city football stadium. Construction of the complex began in 2006. The director is Rešid Pepić. The complex was created by the decision of The Municipal Assembly of Rožaje number 1383 from 10.07 2006. The main activity of the complex is the management and maintenance of sports facilities as well as:
 providing services in the field of sports and recreation
 provision of sport competitions for the organization of sports events and training
 provision of services to citizens and working collectives in sport and recreational activities
 organizing sports and cultural and public events

The main arena is built for various sports, such as:
 Basketball
 Handball
 Futsal
 Table tennis
 Indoor tennis
 Volleyball
 and other

Supporters
Ibar fans are known as Gazije (Arabic: ghāzī or ghazah/gazi, from ghazw, pl. ghazawāt, armed incursion with the intention of conquering - Gazije were the defenders of Islam (Islamic fighters) in the period of the Ottoman Empire). The group's traditional colours are black and white, which are also the colours of the football club FK Ibar, where Gazije first started giving their support. After the football club failed to reach the First Montenegrin League in 2006, 2007, and 2008, the footballers lost the support of fans since they failed to win the away play-off match against FK Dečić for the First league placement. The volleyball team had its biggest support when the women's team played in the First division.

Team roster

This is the roster of OK Ibar for the season 2013-14. The manager is Isko Bećović.
  Merdan Nokić
  Edin Šabanović
  Seid Šabanović
  Emir Ćosović
  Jupo Kalač
  Admir Rebronja
  Obrad Nikolić
  Adis Tahirović
  Alen Dacić
  Amar Bećović
  Nermin Topalović
  Rinor Dacić

Season 2013–14

Group A

|}

Group B

|}

See also
 KK Ibar
 FK Ibar
 Sports Center Rožaje

References

External links
 Two matches in one day of OK Ibar

Montenegrin volleyball clubs
Sport in Rožaje
Rožaje
Sandžak